Vincenzo Giannatempo (Turin, Italy, 19 December 1973), better known as Wender or Mago Wender is an Italian deejay, radio host, known for the radio programs Lo Zoo di 105 on Radio 105 Network and Asganaway on Radio Deejay.

Filmography

Movies
 On Air: Storia di un successo (2016)

References

Italian radio presenters
Living people
1973 births
Mass media people from Turin